Vir Sen  also spelt  Veer Sen is an Indian politician.  He was elected to the Lok Sabha, the lower house of the Parliament of India from the Khurja constituency of Uttar Pradesh as a member of the Indian National Congress.

References

India MPs 1984–1989
Indian National Congress politicians
Possibly living people
Year of birth missing